The Clever Mrs. Carfax is a 1917 American comedy silent film directed by Donald Crisp and written by Gardner Hunting and Hector Turnbull. The film features female impersonator Julian Eltinge and stars Daisy Jefferson, Noah Beery, Sr., Rosita Marstini, Jennie Lee, and Fred Church. The film was released on November 5, 1917, by Paramount Pictures.

Plot
As described in a film magazine, Billy Wise (Church) dares his friend Temple Trask (Eltinge) to dress in women's garb and take luncheon with him at the club. Trask takes up the challenge and while dressed as  Mrs. Carfax meets Helen Scott (Jefferson). Helen has a sickly grandmother who is afraid that her granddaughter will take all of her money, and so she puts her trust in two crooked hirelings. Trask recognizes the grandmother's secretary as a former jailbird and, realizing the situation, accompanies Helen and her grandmother home. Without letting his identity become known, Trask as himself and later as Mrs. Carfax discovers that Helen cares for him. At the grandmother's home, he can catch the secretary and maid with negotiable securities, trying to make good their escape. He then confesses his costume ruse to Helen, who would rather have him as Trask.

Cast 
Julian Eltinge as Temple Trask / Mrs. Carfax
Daisy Jefferson as Helen Scott
Noah Beery, Sr. as Adrian Graw
Rosita Marstini as Rena Varsey
Jennie Lee as Mrs. Mary Keyes
Fred Church as Billy Wise
Mary Wise as Mrs. Bruce
Fred De Shon as Trask's Valet

References

External links

1917 films
1910s English-language films
Silent American comedy films
1917 comedy films
Paramount Pictures films
Films directed by Donald Crisp
American black-and-white films
American silent feature films
1910s American films